Land of Liberty is a 1939 American documentary film written by Jesse L. Lasky Jr. and Jeanie Macpherson. The film tells the history of the United States from pre-Revolution through 1939. The film was released on June 15, 1939, by Metro-Goldwyn-Mayer.

References

External links 
 

1939 films
American documentary films
1939 documentary films
Black-and-white documentary films
Metro-Goldwyn-Mayer films
Documentary films about United States history
American black-and-white films
1930s English-language films
1930s American films